is a district of Ōta, Tokyo, Japan. As of January 1, 2011, Haneda had a total population of 14,885.

Climate

References

Districts of Ōta, Tokyo